Nea Karvali is a village and a community of the Kavala municipality. 

Most of the inhabitants are descendants of Cappadocian Greeks who arrived from Karvali (today Guzelyurt, Turkey) following the Greek-Turkish population exchange in 1924.

Before the 2011 local government reform it was part of the municipality of Kavala, of which it was a municipal district. The 2011 census recorded 2,160 inhabitants in the village and 2,225 inhabitants in the community. The community of Nea Karvali covers an area of 46.297 km2.

Administrative division
The community of Nea Karvali consists of three separate settlements: 
Ano Lefki (population 17)
Lefki (population 48)
Nea Karvali (population 2,160)
The aforementioned population figures are as of 2011.

See also
 List of settlements in the Kavala regional unit

References

Populated places in Kavala (regional unit)